Henri Sirvain (born 6 September 1941) is a French bobsledder. He competed in the two-man and the four-man events at the 1968 Winter Olympics.

References

1941 births
Living people
French male bobsledders
Olympic bobsledders of France
Bobsledders at the 1968 Winter Olympics
Sportspeople from Haute-Savoie